Dying Sun is the second full-length studio album by the French death metal band Yyrkoon.

Track listing
 "Idols Are Burning" – 0:30
 "Crystal Light" – 3:42
 "Flight of the Titan" – 5:00
 "The Clans" – 3:51
 "Thrash-em All" – 6:27
 "Gods of Silver" – 2:58
 "Stolen Souls" – 5:00
 "Screamer" – 6:25
 "Back to the Cave" – 4:35
 "Dying Sun" – 1:56

Personnel
Stéphane Souteryand - vocals, guitars
François Falempin - guitars
Geoffrey Gautier - keyboards
Victorien Vilchez - bass
Laurent Harrouart - drums

References

2004 albums
Yyrkoon (band) albums